Ludovico Trevisan (November 1401 – March 22, 1465) was an Italian catholic prelate, who was the Camerlengo of the Holy Roman Church, Patriarch of Aquileia and Captain General of the Church. He succeeded his rival Giovanni Vitelleschi, a fellow cardinal of military talent and inclination, as Bishop of Traù and Metropolitan Archbishop of Florence. Trevisan was also known as the Cardinal of Aquileia and the Cardinal Camerlengo.

Early life 
Trevisan was born into a non-military family in Padua, then in the territory of the Republic of Venice, the son of Biagio Trevisano, a doctor in the arts and medicine. Like other war cardinals, such as Niccolò Fortiguerra and Giuliano della Rovere, Trevisan came from a humble background. His mother's maiden name was Mezzarota. His first name is sometimes also rendered Ludovico, Luigi, Luise, and Alvise; his last name as Trevisano or Scarampi-Mezzarota.

Trevisan studied grammar and poetry, followed by the liberal arts, in Venice; he obtained a doctorate in arts and medicine at the University of Padua on July 9, 1425. After a brief stint teaching medicine, Trevisan went to Rome circa 1430 to become the physician of Cardinal Gabrile Condulmer (future Pope Eugene IV). Upon Condulmer's election as pope, Trevisan was made his cubicularius and scriptor of apostolic letters. He soon also became a canon of the cathedral chapter of Padua and began his ecclesiastical career.

Bishopric 

Trevisan was elected bishop of Traù on October 24, 1435, was consecrated soon after his election, and remained bishop until August 6, 1437, governing it through his vicar, Niccolò, abbot of the monastery of S. Giovanni Battista in Traù. On August 6, 1437, Trevisan was promoted to metropolitan bishop of Florence, which he occupied until December 18, 1439. There is record of Trevisan being in Ferrara with Eugene IV on January 23, 1438, and his subscription is found on the bull of union with the Greeks issued by Eugenius IV on July 4, 1439.

Trevisan became Patriarch of Aquileia on December 18, 1439, and occupied that see until his death. On April 3, 1440, Trevisan was commissioned as papal legate in Romagna "with the army, with the aim of recovering the lands of the Church." As a result, he undertook military operations starting on July 30 aimed at capturing Bologna but had to pause the campaign from November 23 to the following Spring, at which time he received a sizable sum from the Papal treasury.

He succeeded Vitelleschi as the pope's special deputy, possibly having engineered Vitelleschi's downfall through his henchman, Antonio Rido, and began pacifying the forces still loyal to Vitelleschi and reducing the regions of Viterbo and Civitavecchia to papal obedience. As the pope's special deputy he was the paymaster of the sizable papal army and controlled its large budget, and commanded it in the field.

On June 4, 1440 he received a special military standard and proceeded to Tuscany with a force of 3000 horsemen and 500 foot soldiers to support Francesco I Sforza and other papal and Florentine condottieri against Niccolò Piccinino. Trevisan commanded the right flank of the combined papal-Florentine forces that defeated Piccinino in the Battle of Anghiari on June 29.

An account of his victory is also available in an important contemporary war poem, Trophaeum Anglaricum by Florentine humanist Leonardo Dati, which praises Trevisan's caution as much as his impetuosity, comparing him to captains of antiquity such as Alexander the Great and Hannibal.

Cardinalate 

Immediately afterward, on July 1, 1440, Trevisan was elevated cardinal priest, title of S. Lorenzo, by Pope Eugene IV and a medal in his honor was designed by Cristoforo di Geremia to commemorate the victory. Upon his elevation, Bishop Fortunato di Pellicanis of Sarsina began administering his patriarchate. Later that year, he became Camerlengo, an office he held until his death.

When Eugene IV and Filippo Visconti turned against Sforza, Trevisan was the organizer of the campaign to recapture the March of Ancona (to which he was named legate on September 13, 1442) for the papacy. Under Pope Callixtus III, Trevisan played an important role in organizing the naval campaign against the Ottomans in December 1455, both responsible for the construction of the papal navy and appointed "apostolic legate, governor general, captain and general condottiere" in charge of it. Trevisan defeated the Turkish assault on Mytilene in August 1457, during which many Turkish vessels were captured, receiving praise from the pope. Trevisan attended the papal congress of war in Mantua in 1459 where chronicler Andrea Schivenoglia described him on arrival as "aged sixty, a small, swarthy, hairy man, with a very proud, dark air about him" ("homo pizolo, negro, peloxo, com aìero molte superbo e schuro").

Trevisan was the only cardinal in the papal conclave, 1464 that did not subscribe to the conclave capitulation, which among other things, bound the pope to continue the Crusading war against the Ottoman Turks.

Death and legacy 
Trevisan died during the first year of the pontificate of Pope Paul II, with whom Trevisan was not on good terms, at 3 a.m. in Rome of edema. Like Cardinal Gil Álvarez Carrillo de Albornoz, Trevisan has been described as an "angel of peace".

Notes

References 
 Chambers, D.S. 2006. Popes, Cardinals & War: The Military Church in Renaissance and Early Modern Europe. I.B. Tauris. .

1401 births
1465 deaths
Clergy from Padua
15th-century Italian cardinals
Patriarchs of Aquileia
15th-century Roman Catholic archbishops in the Republic of Florence
Cardinal-bishops of Albano
Roman Catholic archbishops of Florence
Apostolic Camera
Camerlengos of the Holy Roman Church
Burials at San Lorenzo in Damaso
Captains General of the Church
Christians of the Crusades